Daniele D'Onofrio (born 8 October 1993) is an Italian male long-distance runner, who won two gold medal with the Italian team at the European 10,000m Cup.

Biography
His most important international achievement was the bronze medal won at the 2016 European Athletics Championships.

Achievements

National titles
 Italian Athletics Championships
 Half marathon: 2016, 2020

References

External links
 

1993 births
Living people
Italian male long-distance runners
Athletics competitors of Fiamme Oro